The 1967–68 Bulgarian Hockey League season was the 16th season of the Bulgarian Hockey League, the top level of ice hockey in Bulgaria. Eight teams participated in the league, and Metallurg Pernik won the championship.

Standings

External links
 Season on hockeyarchives.info

Bulgar
Bulgarian Hockey League seasons
Bulg